The Detroit Hettche were a minor league professional ice hockey team based in Detroit, Michigan, and played at the Detroit Olympia. The team was originally known as the Windsor Spitfires and were one of the four founding members of the International Hockey League in 1945. The team was renamed Windsor Hettche Spitfires in 1947, then moved across the river from Windsor, Ontario in 1949. The team played seven seasons total, folding in 1952.

Season-by-season results

External links
 standings and results - Detroit Hettche
 standings and results - Windsor Hettche Spitfires
 standings and results - Windsor Spitfires

International Hockey League (1945–2001) teams
H
Professional ice hockey teams in Michigan
Defunct ice hockey teams in the United States
Ice hockey clubs established in 1945
Sports clubs disestablished in 1952